Omar Ajete Iglesias (born July 31, 1965 in San Juan, Pinar del Río, Cuba) is a former baseball player, who starred for the Cuban National Series' Pinar del Río Vegueros and the Cuban national team.

Ajete, a left-handed starter, compiled a career record of 179-96 over sixteen 90-game seasons in the National Series. He pitched for Cuba's gold medal-winning teams at the 1992 and 1996 Olympic games.

References

External links
 

1965 births
Living people
Olympic baseball players of Cuba
Olympic gold medalists for Cuba
Olympic silver medalists for Cuba
Olympic medalists in baseball
Medalists at the 1992 Summer Olympics
Medalists at the 1996 Summer Olympics
Medalists at the 2000 Summer Olympics
Baseball players at the 1992 Summer Olympics
Baseball players at the 1996 Summer Olympics
Baseball players at the 2000 Summer Olympics
Pan American Games gold medalists for Cuba
Baseball players at the 1991 Pan American Games
Baseball players at the 1995 Pan American Games
Pan American Games medalists in baseball
Goodwill Games medalists in baseball
Competitors at the 1990 Goodwill Games
Medalists at the 1991 Pan American Games
Medalists at the 1995 Pan American Games
People from Pinar del Río Province
20th-century Cuban people